The 2014 season is Tromsø's first in the Norwegian First Division since 2002, following their relegation at the end of the 2013 season.

Squad

Transfers

Winter

In:

Out:

Summer

In:

Out:

Competitions

1. divisjon

Results summary

Results by round

Results

Table

Norwegian Cup

Squad statistics

Appearances and goals

|-
|colspan="14"|Players away from Tromsø on loan:
|-
|colspan="14"|Players who left Tromsø during the season:

|}

Goal scorers

Disciplinary record

References

Tromsø IL seasons
Tromsø